The 2019 A-Lyga is the 27th edition of Lithuania's women's football league.

Results

References

A Lyga (women)
Lith
Lith
Women